Loky-Manambato is a protected area in northern Madagascar. 

The protected area covers 2484.09 km2, and includes a block of dry deciduous forests, mangroves, and a large lake. It is located in northern Sava Region, bounded on the north by the Loky River, on the south by the Manambato River, and on the east by the Indian Ocean.

Flora and fauna
Loky-Manambato is in the dry deciduous forests of northern Madagascar, near the transition to the moist evergreen forests of eastern Madagascar and the montane forests of Madagascar's central highlands.

Plant communities in the protected area include montane moist evergreen forest, moist semideciduous rainforest, dry deciduous forest, riparian forest, rupicolous vegetation, littoral forest, swamp forest, humid grassland, marsh, lake, mangrove, secondary grassland, secondary thicket, and secondary forest.

8 species of lemurs, 5 species of carnivorous mammals (including the Malagasy civet (Fossa fossana) and the fossa (Cryptoprocta ferox)) 10 species of bats, 152 species of birds, 27 species of amphibians, and 71 species of reptiles live in the reserve.

References

Protected areas of Madagascar
Madagascar dry deciduous forests
Sava Region